Lacombe is a census-designated place (CDP) in St. Tammany Parish, Louisiana, United States. The population was 8,679 at the 2010 census.

Geography
Lacombe is located at  (30.314863, -89.931462).

Demographics

2020 census

As of the 2020 United States census, there were 8,657 people, 3,456 households, and 2,260 families residing in the CDP.

2000 census
As of the census of 2000, there were 7,518 people, 2,757 households, and 2,059 families residing in the CDP. The racial makeup of the CDP was 69.15% White, 25.31% African American, 1.60% Native American, 0.33% Asian, 0.04% Pacific Islander, 1.36% from other races, and 2.21% from two or more races. Hispanic or Latino of any race were 2.58% of the population.

There were 2,757 households, out of which 33.0% had children under the age of 18 living with them, 56.0% were married couples living together, 13.7% had a female householder with no husband present, and 25.3% were non-families. 20.1% of all households were made up of individuals, and 6.5% had someone living alone who was 65 years of age or older. The average household size was 2.69 and the average family size was 3.09.

In the CDP, the population was spread out, with 25.8% under the age of 18, 7.9% from 18 to 24, 26.9% from 25 to 44, 27.3% from 45 to 64, and 12.1% who were 65 years of age or older. The median age was 39 years. For every 100 females, there were 95.0 males. For every 100 females age 18 and over, there were 90.8 males.

The median income for a household in the CDP was $37,782, and the median income for a family was $45,465. Males had a median income of $37,580 versus $21,869 for females. The per capita income for the CDP was $18,642. About 8.9% of families and 11.7% of the population were below the poverty line, including 15.6% of those under age 18 and 10.2% of those age 65 or over.

Education
Lacombe is within the St. Tammany Parish Public Schools district.

Schools that serve most of Lacombe include:
 Chahta-Ima Elementary School
 Bayou Lacombe Middle School
 Monteleone Junior High School
 Lakeshore High School - St. Tammany Parish's newest high school, opened August 2009

Schools that serve small sections of Lacombe:
 Woodlake Elementary School in Mandeville serves a small portion of western Lacombe
 Mandeville Middle School near Mandeville serves a small portion of western Lacombe
 Slidell Junior High School in Slidell serves a small portion of eastern Lacombe
 Slidell High School in Slidell serves a small portion of eastern Lacombe

Previously Fontainebleau High School served much of Lacombe.
Previously Mandeville High School served Lacombe.

The main campus of Northshore Technical Community College is in Lacombe. This campus was established in January 2017.

Notable people
Pete Schneider, former member of the Louisiana House of Representatives and Lacombe resident
Adrien Rouquette, (born in Louisiana in 1813, of French parentage; died in 1887) was a writer and a Catholic missionary among the Choctaw Native Americans.

References

External links

 NorthshoreDeals.org

Census-designated places in Louisiana
Census-designated places in St. Tammany Parish, Louisiana
Census-designated places in New Orleans metropolitan area